The 1945 Minnesota Golden Gophers football team represented the University of Minnesota in the 1945 Big Ten Conference football season. In their 11th non-consecutive year under head coach Bernie Bierman (Bierman was not Minnesota's coach from 1942 to 1944), the Golden Gophers compiled a 4–5 record and outscored their opponents by a combined total of 177 to 55.

Tackle Bob Fitch was awarded the team's MVP award.

Total attendance for the season was 246,931, which averaged to 41,155. The season high for attendance was against Ohio State.

Schedule

Game summaries

Michigan

On November 3, 1945, Minnesota lost to Michigan by a 26 to 0 score. Michigan's touchdowns were scored by Yerges (short run in the first quarter), fullback Jack Weisenburger (13-yard run in fourth quarter), and halfbacks Wally Teninga and Warren Bentz (12-yard pass from Don Robinson). Bob Callahan kicked two points after touchdown. Michigan gained 261 rushing yards and 131 passing yards in the game.

References

Minnesota
Minnesota Golden Gophers football seasons
Minnesota Golden Gophers football